Marion Reiff (born 21 May 1979) is an Austrian diver. She competed at the 2000 Summer Olympics and the 2004 Summer Olympics.

References

External links
 

1979 births
Living people
Austrian female divers
Olympic divers of Austria
Divers at the 2000 Summer Olympics
Divers at the 2004 Summer Olympics
Divers from Vienna